Branca is a feminine given name. It means "white" in Portuguese (it is a Portuguese cognate of the name Blanche).

People with the surname
Infanta Branca, Lady of Guadalajara (1192–1240), Portuguese royal
Infanta Branca of Portugal (1259–1321), Portuguese nun
Giovanni Branca (1571–1645), Italian architect
Ascanio Branca (1830–1903), Italian politician and Minister of Finance
Wilhelm von Branca (born 1844), German paleontologist and vulcanologist
Giulio Branca (1851–1926), Italian sculptor
Angelo Branca (1903–1984), Canadian judge
Vittore Branca (1913–2004), Italian philologist and critic
Toni Branca (1916–1985), Swiss racing driver
Ralph Branca (1926–2016), major league baseball pitcher
Glenn Branca (born 1948), American composer
John Branca (born 1950), American entertainment lawyer
Daniel Branca (1951–2005), Argentinian artist
Dona Branca, 20th-century Portuguese con artist
Marco Branca (born 1965), Italian International footballer

See also
Branka, a feminine given name
Bianca, a feminine given name
Bianka, a feminine given name
Blanca (given name), a feminine given name
Blanka (given name), a feminine given name

References